UFC 59: Reality Check was a mixed martial arts event held by the Ultimate Fighting Championship on April 15, 2006 at the Arrowhead Pond in Anaheim, California, and broadcast live on pay-per-view in the United States and Canada.

This was the first UFC event held in California after the state's legalization of mixed martial arts contests. It was a sold-out show, and was one of the fastest sell outs in UFC history.

According to the California State Athletic Commission, there were 13,060 tickets sold, with a live gate of $2,191,450. The disclosed fighter payroll for the event was $539,000.

Results

Bonus Awards

Fight of the Night: Tito Ortiz vs. Forrest Griffin

Reported PayoutTito Ortiz: $200,000Andrei Arlovski: $90,000Tim Sylvia: $90,000Evan Tanner: $40,000Karo Parisyan: $16,000Sean Sherk: $16,000Forrest Griffin: $16,000David Terrell: $12,000Nick Diaz: $10,000Jeff Monson: $10,000Jason Lambert: $8,000Thiago Alves: $8,000Justin Levens: $5,000Nick Thompson: $5,000Marcio Cruz: $5,000Derrick Noble: $3,000Scott Smith: $3,000Terry Martin: $2,000Disclosed Fighter Payroll:''' $539,000

See also
 Ultimate Fighting Championship
 List of UFC champions
 List of UFC events
 2006 in UFC

References

External links
UFC Fighter Salaries for 2006 (includes fighter salaries for UFC 59)

Ultimate Fighting Championship events
2006 in mixed martial arts
Mixed martial arts in Anaheim, California
Sports competitions in Anaheim, California
2006 in sports in California
Events in Anaheim, California